"Bad of the Heart" is the second single from freestyle singer George Lamond's debut album Bad of the Heart. It is his biggest hit, peaking at number 25 in the U.S. The song was released on March 22, 1990 by Columbia Records. It was written by Philip Andreula, Marilyn Rodriguez and produced by Mark Liggett and Chris Barbosa.

Track listing
US CD maxi-single

US 12" single

Charts

References

1990 singles
George Lamond songs
Song recordings produced by Chris Barbosa
Columbia Records singles
1990 songs